Garrod is a surname, and may refer to:

 Alfred Baring Garrod (1819–1907), English physician
 Alfred Henry Garrod (1846–1879), English vertebrate zoologist
 Archibald Garrod (1857–1936), British physician
 Dorothy Garrod (1892–1968), British archaeologist, daughter of Archibald Garrod
 Guy Garrod (1891–1965), British RAF officer
 H. W. Garrod (1878–1960), British scholar

See also
 Harrod (disambiguation)